Endoclita coomani is a species of moth of the family Hepialidae. It is known from Vietnam.

References

External links
Hepialidae genera

Moths described in 1949
Hepialidae